Hardwicke House is a seven-episode sitcom produced by Central Independent Television for the ITV network. It was originally produced in the beginning of 1987. It was so negatively received that only the first two episodes were transmitted.

Plot and episode titles 
The series is set in the large comprehensive school of the title, the staff of which are as dysfunctional as the pupils. One teacher is a multiple murderer while the deputy headmaster lusts after male pupils. One teacher, Moose Magnusson, is on an extended exchange placement because his own school in Iceland refuses to have him back.

 Episode 1 – "The Visit" (24 February 1987)
 Episode 2 – "The First Day of Term" (25 February 1987)
 Episode 3 – "Interview Day" (scheduled for 4 March 1987)
 Episode 4 – "Prize Giving" (scheduled for 11 March 1987)
 Episode 5 – "Old Boys" (scheduled for 18 March 1987)
 Episode 6 – "An Inspector Calls" (scheduled for 25 March 1987)
 Episode 7 – "Passion Play" (scheduled for 1 April 1987)

Production and curtailed broadcast 
The series was extensively trailed and also mentioned on the front cover of the TV Times for the week of the first two episodes: a double-length premiere and a regular episode, which were shown on consecutive Tuesday and Wednesday nights.

Later episodes were scheduled for subsequent Wednesdays, but the public and press outcry against the series was so great that the series was pulled and replaced with repeats of Chance in a Million before the third episode was aired. The decision to pull the show was taken at such short notice that TV Times was unable to change its listings and the Hardwicke House feature.

References

External links 
 

1987 British television series debuts
1987 British television series endings
1980s British sitcoms
ITV sitcoms
1987 controversies
Television shows produced by Central Independent Television
English-language television shows
Television controversies in the United Kingdom
Television shows set in Nottinghamshire